He's a Friend  is the seventh album by former Temptations vocalist Eddie Kendricks. It was released in February 1976 on the Tamla imprint of Motown Records.

Reception
This album was totally embraced by the black and gay underground clubs as a complete entity. The lead and album title single, "He's a Friend", merged the classic Motown sound with T.S.O.P., the Sound of Philadelphia, courtesy of Norman Harris and several Philly sessions players. That first single was rotated like a #1 record at these clubs. Along with that, "Get it While It's Hot", "I Won't Take No" and even the ballad "Part of Me" was spun when clubs would play one or two downtempo tracks at the close of an evening. This diverse club play made "He's a Friend" an underground club classic.

"He's a Friend" fell one step away from securing another #1 R&B single for Eddie, stopping at #2 behind "Disco Lady" by Johnnie Taylor. Eddie had an impressive 9 Top 10 hits (10 if The Temptations reunion single, "Standing on the Top" counted, since the song was recorded when he was a solo artist). Two more singles, like the smash "Girl You Need A Change Of Mind" also made the Top 20.

Track listing
"He's a Friend" (Allan Felder, Bruce Gray, T.G. Conway) 4:36 
"A Part of Me" (Allan Felder, Norman Harris, Ron Tyson aka "Tyron Presson")  3:16
"I Won't Take No" (Allan Felder, Norman Harris, Ron Tyson aka "Tyron Presson")  2:55
"Never Gonna Leave You" (Allan Felder, Bruce Gray, T.G. Conway)  4:08
"Get It While It's Hot" (Mike Holden, Theodore Life)  3:09
"Chains" (Allan Felder, Bunny Sigler, Norman Harris, Ron Tyson)  3:23
"The Sweeter You Treat Her" (Buddy Turner, Jerry Akines, Johnny Bellmon, Victor Drayton)  4:53
"It's Not What You Got" (Allan Felder, T.G. Conway)  4:07
"On My Way Home" (Buddy Turner, Jerry Akines, Johnny Bellmon, Victor Drayton)  3:49
"All of My Love" (Allan Felder, Bruce Gray)  2:46

Personnel
Eddie Kendricks - lead and backing vocals 
Norman Harris - guitar
Vincent Montana Jr. - vibraphone
Bruce Gray - keyboards, backing vocals
Michael "Sugar Bear" Foreman, Ron Baker - bass
Charles Collins, Earl "The Pearl" Young - drums
Bobby Eli, T.J. Tindall - Guitar
Carlton Kent, Ron "Have Mercy" Kersey, T. G. Conway - keyboards
Larry Washington - congas
Don Renaldo - horns, strings
Barbara Ingram, Bruce Hawes, Carl Helm, Carla Benson, Darryl Grant, Evette Benton - backing vocals
Allan Felder - vocal arrangements, percussion, backing vocals
Norman Harris, Vincent Montana, Jr., T.G. Conway, Ron "Have Mercy" Tyson - arrangements

Charts

Singles

References

External links
 Eddie Kendricks-He's A Friend at Discogs.com

1976 albums
Eddie Kendricks albums
Albums produced by Norman Harris
Albums recorded at Sigma Sound Studios
Tamla Records albums